IMDT may refer to:

 The Illegal Migrants (Determination by Tribunal) (IMDT) Act
 Inverse Definite Minimum Time, a characteristic of relays